Mucoa is a genus of plant in the family Apocynaceae first described as a genus in 1988. It is native to northern South America.

Species
 Mucoa duckei (Markgr.) Zarucchi - Colombia, Peru, N Brazil 
 Mucoa pantchenkoana (Markgr.) Zarucchi - Bolívar in Venezuela, Roraima in Brazil

References

Apocynaceae genera
Rauvolfioideae